Viral is a Brazilian comedy web series by comedy group Porta dos Fundos, in which Gregório Duvivier stars as Beto, a man who after discovering that is carrying the HIV virus, decides to seek the latest eight women with whom he had sexual intercourse to give the news and try to find out who is the possible transmitter.

The series consists of four webisodes, the first webisode premiered on April 5, 2014 at the Porta dos Fundos' YouTube channel.

Webisodes

Conception
Porchat came up with the idea for Viral during a trip to Africa, a continent where HIV/AIDS is a serious public health issue. The inspiration came after he watched the film 50/50, in which the young Adam (Joseph Gordon-Levitt) discovers he has cancer and learns to deal with the problem with the support of a friend. Another inspiration was the episode "Sex Ed" of the American television comedy series The Office, in which the character Michael Scott (Steve Carell) contacts all his ex-girlfriends after being told that his cold sore is a form of herpes.

References

2014 web series debuts
Comedy web series
Brazilian web series